Valentinus de Valentiuis was a Roman Catholic prelate who served as Bishop of Guardialfiera (1519–?).

Biography
On 2 December 1519, Valentinus de Valentiuis was appointed during the papacy of Pope Julius II as Bishop of Guardialfiera replacing bishop Zacharias Ferreri who renounced his nomination two months after his appointment.
It is uncertain how long he served as Ferreri claimed his rights as Bishop of Guardialfiera  after the death of Pope Leo X on 1 Dec 1521.

References

External links and additional sources
 (for Chronology of Bishops) 
 (for Chronology of Bishops) 

16th-century Italian Roman Catholic bishops
Bishops appointed by Pope Julius II